Shield mantis, hood mantis (or hooded mantis) and leaf mantis (or leafy mantis) are common names for certain praying mantises with an extended thorax aiding it in camouflage and leaf mimicry.  The terms are used for species in the following genera:
Asiadodis
Choeradodis
Rhombodera
Tamolanica

See also
List of mantis genera and species
Leaf mantis

Mantodea
Insect common names